British Nuclear Fuels Limited (BNFL) was a nuclear energy and fuels company owned by the UK Government. It was a manufacturer of nuclear fuel (notably MOX), ran reactors, generated and sold electricity, reprocessed and managed spent fuel (mainly at Sellafield), and decommissioned nuclear plants and other similar facilities.

It was created in February 1971 from the de-merger of the production division of the UK Atomic Energy Authority (UKAEA).

Until 2003, its headquarters were at Risley, near Warrington, England. BNFL's headquarters were then moved to Daresbury Park industrial estate, also near Warrington.
On 1 April 2005, BNFL formed a new holding company and started a rigorous restructuring process which would transfer or sell most of its entire domain, divisions. In 2005, it transferred all of its nuclear sites to the Nuclear Decommissioning Authority. It then sold its Westinghouse Electric Company subsidiary in February 2006. Later, BNFL sold the separate companies that made up its major subsidiary, British Nuclear Group, leaving a decommissioning and reprocessing organisation which became Sellafield Ltd. By May 2009, BNFL had completed the sales of all its assets and had no remaining operational activities or businesses.

BNFL continued to exist only as a legal entity to meet all pension liabilities and any obligations arising from disposal programmes. However, on 14 October 2010, the Minister for the Cabinet Office, Francis Maude, announced that BNFL would be abolished along with a number of other government organisations.

History

British Nuclear Fuels Limited (BNFL) was set up in February 1971 from the demerger of the production division of the UK Atomic Energy Authority (UKAEA). In 1984, BNFL became a public limited company as British Nuclear Fuels plc, wholly owned by the UK government.

US subsidiary BNFL, Inc. was established in 1990 and specialised in decontamination and decommissioning of nuclear sites.

In 1996, the UK's eight most advanced nuclear plants, seven advanced gas-cooled reactors (AGR) and one pressurised water reactor (PWR) were privatised as British Energy, raising £2.1 billion. The oldest reactors, the Magnox sites, were not attractive for commercial operations and remained in public ownership as Magnox Electric. On 30 January 1998, Magnox Electric was merged into BNFL as BNFL Magnox Generation.

Quality data falsification crisis

In 1999, it was discovered that BNFL staff had been falsifying some MOX fuel quality assurance data since 1996. A Nuclear Installations Inspectorate (NII) investigation concluded that "the level of control and supervision ... had been virtually non-existent." BNFL had to pay compensation to the Japanese customer, Kansai Electric, and take back a flawed shipment of MOX fuel from Japan. BNFL's Chief Executive John Taylor resigned, after initially resisting resignation when the NII's damning report was published.

As a consequence of this crisis, a possible partial privatisation of BNFL was delayed by two years.

Expansion
In 1999, BNFL acquired Westinghouse Electric Company, the commercial nuclear power businesses of CBS (Westinghouse acquired CBS in 1995 and reoriented itself as a broadcaster), for $1.1 billion. Westinghouse's businesses are fuel manufacture, decommissioning of nuclear sites and reactor design, construction and servicing. Westinghouse was acquired as a possible core for the privatisation of a portion of BNFL.

In 2000, BNFL also purchased the nuclear businesses of ABB for £300 million. This company, which was merged into Westinghouse, had nuclear interests in the United States, Europe and Asia. In June 2000, BNFL took a 22.5% stake in Pebble Bed Modular Reactor (Pty) Ltd in South Africa.

In January 2003, the research and development arm of BNFL was relaunched as Nuclear Sciences and Technology Services (NSTS).

However, BNFL's financial difficulties increased, and the prospect of partial privatisation diminished.

Reorganisation
On 1 April 2005, the company was reorganised as part of the restructuring of the wider nuclear industry. BNFL became British Nuclear Group (BNG) and a new holding company was established and adopted the British Nuclear Fuels name. This new BNFL operated largely through its major subsidiaries of Westinghouse and BNG as well as Nexia Solutions, its commercial nuclear technology business formed out of NSTS.

The Nuclear Decommissioning Authority (NDA) was established on 1 April 2005 and took ownership of all of BNFL's nuclear sites, including the Sellafield site. The NDA then opened up the decommissioning of the different sites to tender to drive down costs. BNFL became one of a number of decommissioning contractors through BNG. BNFL's nuclear waste transfer companies, Direct Rail Services and International Nuclear Services, were also both transferred to the NDA.

On 19 April 2005, BNFL, Inc. was renamed BNG America and made a subsidiary of BNG.

Sale of Westinghouse
In July 2005, BNFL confirmed it planned to sell Westinghouse, then estimated to be worth $1.8bn (£1bn). However the bid attracted interest from several companies, including Toshiba, General Electric and Mitsubishi Heavy Industries and when the Financial Times reported on 23 January 2006 that Toshiba had won the bid, it valued the company's offer at $5bn (£2.8bn). On 6 February 2006, Toshiba confirmed it was buying Westinghouse Electric Company for $5.4bn and announced it would sell a minority stake to investors.

Break up of British Nuclear Group
On 3 February 2006, BNFL announced it had agreed to sell BNG America to Envirocare to form EnergySolutions.

In March 2006, BNFL announced its intention to sell BNG. With the sale of Westinghouse, BNG America and BNG this was to effectively bring BNFL to an end. Mike Parker, CEO of BNFL, said: "By the end of 2007... there will be little need for the BNFL corporate centre from this time". On 22 August 2006, BNFL announced that instead of selling BNG as a going concern it would instead sell it off piece by piece.

In January 2007, BNFL announced that it would sell BNG's Magnox reactor sites operating business, Reactor Sites Management Company Ltd. It was later sold in June 2007, along with its subsidiary that held the operating contracts with the NDA, Magnox Electric, to EnergySolutions. All UK Magnox power stations are due cease operation by the end of 2015.

BNG Project Services, BNG's specialist nuclear consulting business, was sold in January 2008 to VT Group, which was itself later acquired in 2010 by Babcock International Group.

BNG was renamed Sellafield Ltd and became the NDA's Site Licence Company (SLC) for the decommissioning contract at Sellafield. In November 2008, the NDA contracted the management of Sellafield Ltd to Nuclear Management Partners Ltd, a consortium of URS, AMEC and Areva.

Formation of the National Nuclear Laboratory
In July 2006, the UK Government stated its intention to preserve and develop key research and development capabilities potentially as part of a National Nuclear Laboratory (NNL). In October 2006, Secretary of State for Trade and Industry, Alistair Darling confirmed the NNL would be formed out of Nexia Solutions and the British Technology Centre at Sellafield. The NNL was launched in July 2008 as a Government-owned company, and initially was managed under contract by a consortium of Serco, Battelle and the University of Manchester - this is known as a GOCO (Government-Owned, Contractor-Operated) arrangement.

Final disposals
Control of BNFL's one third stake in Urenco was transferred to the Shareholder Executive in April 2008 through Enrichment Holdings Ltd while the government explored the possibility of selling the stake.

BNFL's one third stake of AWE Management Ltd was sold to Jacobs Engineering Group in December 2008. AWE is responsible for the support and manufacturing of the UK's nuclear deterrent.

As BNFL was wound down it was converted back to a private limited company on 31 December 2008 and regained its original name, British Nuclear Fuels Limited. The final sale transactions for BNFL's former businesses were completed in May 2009.

Sites

BNFL formerly had operations at 18 sites in the UK:
Berkeley nuclear power station (shut down in 1989)
Bradwell nuclear power station (shut down in 2002)
Calder Hall nuclear power station (shut down in 2003)
Capenhurst
Chapelcross nuclear power station (shut down in 2004)
Daresbury
Drigg
Dungeness A nuclear power station (shut down in 2006)
Hinkley Point A nuclear power station (shut down in 2000)
Hunterston A nuclear power station (shut down in 1990)
Littlebrook
Maentwrog
Oldbury nuclear power station (shut down in 2012)
Risley
Sellafield
Sizewell A nuclear power station (shut down in 2006)
Springfields (now in partial decommission)
Trawsfynydd nuclear power station (shut down in 1993)
Wylfa nuclear power station (shut down in 2015)

Visual identity

The current graphic identity, including the BNFL logotype, was created in 1996 by Lloyd Northover, the British design consultancy founded by John Lloyd and Jim Northover.

See also
Nuclear power in the United Kingdom
Energy policy of the United Kingdom
Energy use and conservation in the United Kingdom

References

External links
 Archived BNFL website

2010 disestablishments in England
British companies established in 1971
British companies disestablished in 2010
Nuclear technology companies of the United Kingdom
Former nationalised industries of the United Kingdom
Nuclear fuel companies
Defunct energy companies of the United Kingdom
Energy companies established in 1971
Energy companies disestablished in 2010
1971 establishments in England